We Are is the third and final studio album by The City Harmonic. Integrity Music released the album on September 4, 2015.

Critical reception

Matt Conner, giving the album four stars from CCM Magazine, describes, "Fortunately they've maintained their initial heart for unity in the church". Awarding the album four stars at Worship Leader, Gary Durbin states, "The City Harmonic brings another album filled with great musicality...it's a fantastic tool for your personal worship time." Kevin Davis, rating the album four and a half stars for New Release Today, describes, "These are very passionate worship songs sung with vocal sincerity and reverence with biblically based lyrics." Giving the album three and a half stars from Jesus Freak Hideout, mentioning, "There is an intelligence and a vision to this album that is lacking in most other projects that try the anthem-heavy approach, and it was not hard for me to appreciate this album."

Emmalee Manes, awarding the album three stars for Jesus Freak Hideout, recognizing, "They still have the power and upbeat-ness of the original album, as well as the chants of truth that listeners feel compelled to join in on, but there is a certain sincerity that they lack." Rating the album a four out of five from The Christian Beat, Sarah Baylor writes, "We Are is a beautiful masterpiece that rises as an anthem for us to sing to our Lord and Savior!" Jono Davies, giving the album five star for Louder Than the Music, says, "The City Harmonic seem to balance creative and catchy music so well." Giving the album a 4.2 out of five at Christian Music Review, Laura Chambers states, "We Ares mission is to help us become who we are by reminding us Whose we are."

Track listing

Chart performance

References

2015 albums
The City Harmonic albums